Dallam Lane railway station served the suburb of Dallam, Warrington, England from 1831 to 1837 on the Warrington and Newton Railway.

History 
The station opened on 25 July 1831 by the Warrington and Newton Railway. It was situated south of Tanners Lane on the east side of Dallam Lane. A two-storey building was provided which housed the booking and railway offices. To the west of this was a railway yard, which contained a goods shed and several sidings to the east. When the Grand Junction Railway opened on 4 July 1837, Warrington Bank Quay opened and Dallam Lane station closed to passengers on the same day. The site was used as a coal yard until the 1960s when it closed completely. The station building is now used as a public house.

References 

Disused railway stations in Warrington
Railway stations in Great Britain opened in 1831
Railway stations in Great Britain closed in 1837
1831 establishments in England
1837 disestablishments in England